NowSecure (Formerly viaForensics) is a Chicago-based mobile security company that publishes mobile app and device security software.

2009: Beginnings
Former CEO and Co-founder Andrew Hoog was working as a CIO when one of his employees was dismissed. After this dismissal, Hoog was tasked with reviewing whether the employee had stolen any sensitive data from the company. Rather than hire a forensics firm to investigate, Hoog performed the investigation himself and continued to do forensic work on the side.

2009-2014: From Forensics to Security
Hoog and his wife Chee-Young Kim both contributed money to start the company, originally known as Chicago Electronic Discovery and then as viaForensics. Hoog devoted himself full-time to mobile forensics, while Kim continued to work at her corporate job during the day and participated in the business development at night and on weekends. In March 2011, viaForensics was profitable to the extent that it could pay for employee benefits, so Kim left her job and went to work at viaForensics full-time. On June 5 of that year, viaExtract 1.0 was released at a conference in Myrtle Beach. viaForensics introduced what was known as viaLab in March 2013. viaLab was a product that allowed automated testing for a variety of security flaws in apps, including man-in-the-middle attacks, SSL strip attacks, coding problems, and opportunities for reverse engineering.

viaForensics was the subject of INC 5000's "#13 fastest-growing tech company in the US" award in 2014.

2014-Present: Rebrand to NowSecure
In 2014, viaForensics launched viaProtect, an app to show users destinations and sources of data to and from their mobile devices, at RSA Conference. The company then began to focus more on similar individual and enterprise device protection. As a result of this focus shift, viaForensics decided to rebrand as NowSecure.

Products
NowSecure is the publisher of NowSecure Forensics (formerly viaExtract), NowSecure Lab (formerly viaLab), and the NowSecure Mobile Apps (formerly viaProtect). NowSecure Forensics is designed for law enforcement to extract artifacts from mobile devices by applying deleted data recovery and data search. NowSecure Lab is mobile app vulnerability scanning software. NowSecure Mobile is a free end-user oriented vulnerability scanner for iOS, Android, and Blackphone.

In 2014 and 2015, PC Magazine awarded viaProtect its "Editor's Choice for Android Privacy Utilities".

See also
 Mobile Security

References

External links
Official Website

Android (operating system) software
Computer security companies
Computer security software companies
IOS software
Mobile security
Companies based in Chicago
2009 establishments in Illinois